The Kharkiv Oblast Council is the regional oblast council (parliament) of the Kharkiv Oblast (province) located in eastern Ukraine. The council is composed of 120 members and is situated in the oblast's administrative center Kharkiv. Council members are elected for five year terms. In order to gain representation on the council, a party must gain more than 5 percent of the total vote.

On 1 March 2022, during the Russian invasion of Ukraine, the building was bombed in a missile strike. According to the Council, 29 people were killed.

Recent elections

2020
Distribution of seats after the 2020 Ukrainian local elections

Election date was 25 October 2020

2015
Distribution of seats after the 2015 Ukrainian local elections

      
Election date was 25 October 2015

References

1932 establishments in Ukraine
Council
Regional legislatures of Ukraine
Unicameral legislatures